Rileyville may refer to:

Rileyville, New Jersey
Rileyville, Pennsylvania
Rileyville, Virginia